The Railway Children is a children's book written by Edith Nesbit and published in 1906.

The Railway Children may also refer to:

Media
The Railway Children (TV 1968), a 1968 BBC television drama based on the book
The Railway Children (1970 film), a 1970 film based on the book
The Railway Children (2000 film), a 2000 drama television film based on the book
The Railway Children (band), a British alternative rock band
Railway Children (film), a 2016 Indian film